Danil Romanovych Kobtsov (born 1 March 2004) is a Ukrainian professional footballer who plays as a right winger for Ukrainian club Alians Lypova Dolyna.

References

External links
 Profile on Alians Lypova Dolyna official website
 
 

2004 births
Living people
Sportspeople from Sumy
Ukrainian footballers
Association football forwards
FC Alians Lypova Dolyna players
Ukrainian First League players